Martian Gothic: Unification is a 2000 survival horror video game developed by Creative Reality for Microsoft Windows and Coyote Developments for the PlayStation and published by TalonSoft for Microsoft Windows and Take-Two Interactive for the PlayStation. It takes place on a Martian base in the year 2019, where a crew of three (Martin Karne, Diane Matlock, Kenzo Uji) have been tasked to investigate 10 months of radio silence. They soon find that the dead crew members of the base have been killed, and now become re-animated bloodthirsty zombies.

The PlayStation version was one of a number of "budget titles" released near the end of the system's lifespan.

Gameplay 
The game is very similar to the Resident Evil series: third-person perspective; fixed camera angle; tank controls; “Vac-Tubes” in the place of item boxes; and colored key-cards. The game focuses heavily on puzzle solving and exploration, rather than combat. However, the combat system focuses on crowd control or dispatching small and weak enemies as it is easy to become overwhelmed by enemies such as the non-dead who walk at exactly the same pace as the player. The game is centered on three playable characters that are separated. This separate trio gimmick is similar to Day of the Tentacle. One of the unique features of the game is that if the characters ever meet face-to-face, it will result in a game-over. However the player can easily and quickly switch to any character at any moment. A radio is used for easy communication. It is recommended that the player finds a ‘safe area’ before switching characters. The characters have a very limited inventory. Because the characters cannot meet they can trade items using the Vac-Tubes that are scattered throughout the base. The Vac-Tubes can carry up to four items to another hatch connected to the Vac-Tubes anywhere in the base. If the player needs to leave behind items the Vac-Tubes can hold up six items. If the player is unsure where they left an item, it can be checked using any in-game computer to bring up the list of contents of any hatch, including ones that have not been accessed yet.

The purpose of the game is to unravel the events before the characters arrival. To do this the player may search dead bodies for letters or micro-recorders which may contains information about the character, plot, passwords, and the method in which they might have died. Many recordings have been stored on some of the base's computers, which also contain information about the characters, plot and further the player's progress.

Another unique feature of the game is that the non-dead enemies cannot be killed permanently. Shooting an enemy enough times will incapacitate it temporarily, but it will reanimate if the player re-enters the area later and comes too close to the enemy's fallen model.

Saving is done through a computer game called "Martian Mayhem" and is limited to 2-4 saves in the PC version and 12 saves in the PlayStation version. Once the player reaches the Necropolis excavation site, a laptop is found that allows the player to save anywhere.

Plot

Setting 
In Martian Gothic, the player is able to assume the role of three characters sent from Earth to a Martian base called Vita-01. The base was the first human settlement on Mars. The team has been sent to examine why it has been silent for ten months. The last broadcast from the base simply stated: “Stay alone, stay alive.” Upon arrival the player finds that all the residents are apparently dead and must gradually uncover the secrets and nature the last undertaking by Vita-01's crew; the discovery of ancient Martian "Pandora's Box" which, when opened, started a chain of chaotic events that led to the base's downfall, and death of almost all of its inhabitants. However, during the player's progress of uncovering the truth, searching for any possible survivors, and solving Vita-01's many mounting problems, the player finds that the dead crew has become re-animated and begin attacking the player. When the player enters the base each character states that the decontamination process felt wrong. The three characters must not meet due to a threatening alien presence that would cause them to mutate into a “trimorph” if they did.

The Vita-01 base was constructed in 2009 by the Allenby Corporation, implied to be Earth's most powerful megacorporation, to research potential alien life from microfossils on Mars, after discovering in 1996 that a Martian meteorite found in 1984 contains ancient bacteria which had crashed in Antarctica in 11,000 BC. Vita-01 is situated very close to Olympus Mons which can be partially visited by the player upon access to the underground "Necropolis" zone, the human-excavated ruins of an old Martian city of Vita-01.

Development 
Creative Reality's last game shares the same team and same writer as Dreamweb, and as such it relies heavily on writing and puzzles. In an interview with Stephen Marley for Retroaction, he stated that he was unhappy with the final product. 

In this interview it was revealed that the game was initially entitled "Martian Gothic" but during the game's development the team referred to it as "Unification" based on one of the development team's favourite Star Trek episode of the same name as it loosely fitted the theme of a point and click adventure game. This theme was eventually changed to a survival horror game, but it kept many of the item based puzzles from its original concept. As a result of both names a compromise was made to suffix Stephen's title "Martian Gothic" with "Unification" to create Martian Gothic: Unification.

There was also a significant downgrade of the textures for the PlayStation version, but it did allow the player to save more.

Reception 

The PlayStation version of Martian Gothic: Unification received "mixed" reviews according to the review aggregation website Metacritic. Duncan Turner of IGN said that the PC version had "a lot to offer...the story -- though seemingly cobbled together from many different sci-fi plots -- is engaging and keeps you guessing." Steve Smith of GameSpot stated the same console version was a "missed opportunity" as the designers had good ideas but did not mix the game elements into a balanced game." One of more positive reviews came from PlayStation Illustrated.

References

External links 

 
 
 Stephen Marley Retroaction Magazine interview
 Martian Gothic: Unification at Hardcore Gaming 

2000 video games
Action-adventure games
2000s horror video games
PlayStation (console) games
Science fiction video games
Survival video games
Video games developed in the United Kingdom
Video games featuring female protagonists
Video games set on Mars
Windows games
Video games about zombies
Video games set in 2019
Video games set in the 2010s
Video games with pre-rendered 3D graphics
TalonSoft games
Single-player video games
Take-Two Interactive games